The 1929 Sam Houston State Bearkats football team represented Sam Houston State Teachers College (now known as Sam Houston State University) as a member of the Texas Intercollegiate Athletic Association (TIAA) during the 1929 college football season. Led by seventh-year head coach J. W. Jones, the Bearkats compiled an overall record of 5–3–1 with a mark of 2–1–1 in conference play, tying for fourth place in the TIAA.

Schedule

References

Sam Houston State
Sam Houston Bearkats football seasons
Sam Houston State Bearkats football